Michael Holman Finneran (born September 21, 1948) is an American former diver. In 1971 he won the NCAA outdoor and AAU indoor titles and a gold medal at the Pan American Games, all in the 3 m springboard. Next year he won the AAU outdoor springboard title. At the 1972 Summer Olympics, he placed 5th in the springboard and 9th in the 10 m platform.

Biography 
In 1971 Finneran graduated in business administration from the Ohio State University. He later coached both men's and women's teams at the University of South Carolina in 1981–85, and at the University of Alabama in 1985–88, and prepared the national diving team for the 1986 Goodwill Games. He later coached at Enloe High School (1997–2000) and at North Carolina State University. His sister Sharon Finneran is an Olympic swimmer, and her daughter Ariel Rittenhouse is an Olympic diver.

References

1948 births
Living people
Olympic divers of the United States
Divers at the 1972 Summer Olympics
People from Rockville Centre, New York
Sportspeople from New York (state)
American male divers
Pan American Games gold medalists for the United States
Pan American Games medalists in diving
Divers at the 1971 Pan American Games
Medalists at the 1971 Pan American Games